The Money Master is a 1915 American silent drama film directed by George Fitzmaurice and starring Frank Sheridan, Paul McAllister and Calvin Thomas.

Cast
 Frank Sheridan as John Haggleton 
 Paul McAllister as Moran 
 Calvin Thomas as Philip Haggleton 
 Sam Reid as Gentle 
 Anne Meredith as Margaret Lawrence 
 Fania Marinoff as Jenny Moran 
 Bert Gudgeon as Joe

References

Bibliography
 Jay Robert Nash, Robert Connelly & Stanley Ralph Ross. Motion Picture Guide Silent Film 1910-1936. Cinebooks, 1988.

External links
 

1915 films
1915 drama films
1910s English-language films
American silent feature films
Silent American drama films
American black-and-white films
Films directed by George Fitzmaurice
1910s American films